Anomaloglossus parimae is a species of frog in the family Aromobatidae. It is endemic to Venezuela where it is only known from its type locality, Pista Constitución in the Parima Mountains in the Amazonas state; it is expected to be found in nearby Brazil too.
Its natural habitat is tropical rainforest. It is threatened by habitat loss caused by gold mining.

References

parimae
Amphibians of Venezuela
Endemic fauna of Venezuela
Taxonomy articles created by Polbot
Amphibians described in 1997